The Amateurliga Rheinland was the highest football league in the region of the Rheinland Football Association and the third tier of the German football league system from its inception in 1952 to the formation of the Oberliga Südwest and the Verbandsliga Rheinland below it in 1978.

Overview 
The Amateurliga Rheinland was formed in 1952 in the northern half of the state of Rhineland-Palatinate. Before its inception, three separate leagues operated in the area as the highest level of play. The league was a feeder league to the 2. Oberliga Südwest. From 1952 until the establishment of the Oberliga Südwest in 1978, it was the third tier of the football league system.

The winner of the Amateurliga Rheinland was not automatically promoted to its superior league but rather had to take part in a promotion play-off. The champion would have to compete with the winners of the Amateurligas Saarland and Südwest.

Until 1933, the region covered by the Rheinland FA was politically part of the now dissolved German state of Prussia. It was part of the Prussian Rhine Province.

The league was established in 1952 with sixteen teams, the winner gaining promotion to the 2. Oberliga Südwest. The founder members were:

SpVgg Bendorf 
FC Urbar 
VfL Trier 
SpVgg Neuwied 
SC Wirges 
SV Niederlahnstein 
SV Ehrang 
Germania Mudersbach 
TuS Konz 
SSV Heimbach-Weis 
SpVgg Zewen 
VfB Lützel 
SV Remagen 
TuS Mayen 
SV Trier-West 
SG Betzdorf 

In 1956 the league was split into a western and an eastern group with twelve teams each. In 1963 it reverted to its old single group setup.

With the introduction of the Bundesliga in 1963 the Amateurliga was placed below the new Regionalliga Südwest but still retained its third-tier status. It continued to do so after the introduction of the 2. Bundesliga Süd in 1974.

The SC Bad Neuenahr and SC Sinzig hold the record for years in the league, each with 22 out of a possible 26.

Disbanding of the Amateurliga Rheinland 
In 1978, the Oberliga Südwest was formed to allow direct promotion to the 2nd Bundesliga Süd for the Amateure champion of the area. The teams placed one to five gained entry to the Oberliga while the next ten teams were put into the new Verbandsliga Rheinland, now the fourth tier of the football league system. The bottom team was relegated to the Bezirksliga.

Admitted to the new Oberliga:

TuS Neuendorf 
FSV Salmrohr 
SpVgg EGC Wirges 
Eisbachtaler Sportfreunde 
SV Ellingen 

Relegated to the new Verbandsliga:

SV Leiwen 
VfL Neuwied 
SV Remagen 
SC Bad Neuenahr 
FC Bitburg 
TuS Mayen 
Alemannia Plaidt 
VfB Wissen 
SC Sinzig 
TuS Hahnstetten 

Relegated to the Bezirksliga:

Eintracht Höhr

Winners of the Amateurliga Rheinland

Source:

 Bold denotes team gained promotion.
 The TuS Neuendorf, winner of the last two league titles, changed its name to TuS Koblenz in 1982.

References

Sources
 Deutschlands Fußball in Zahlen,  An annual publication with tables and results from the Bundesliga to Verbandsliga/Landesliga, publisher: DSFS
 Kicker Almanach,  The yearbook on German football from Bundesliga to Oberliga, since 1937, published by the Kicker Sports Magazine
 Süddeutschlands Fussballgeschichte in Tabellenform 1897–1988  History of Southern German football in tables, publisher & author: Ludolf Hyll
 Die Deutsche Liga-Chronik 1945–2005  History of German football from 1945 to 2005 in tables, publisher: DSFS, published: 2006

External links 
 Das deutsche Fussball Archiv  Historic German league tables
 Verbandsliga Rheinland at Fussball.de  
 The Rheinland FA  

1978 disestablishments in Germany
Defunct association football leagues in Germany
Football competitions in Rhineland-Palatinate
1952 establishments in West Germany
Sports leagues established in 1952
Ger